This is a list of programmes on TVN 7.

Broadcast 
 19+ (2020–present) (moved from TVN)
 BrzydUla 2 (2020–present)
  (Polish version of Paradise Hotel) (2020–present)
 Kto odmówi pannie młodej? (Who will refuse the bride?) (2020–present)
 Ślub od pierwszego wejrzenia (Polish version of Married At First Sight) (2020–present) (moved from TVN)
 Szkoła (High school) (2020–present) (moved from TVN)
 Zaginiona (Wanted) (2021–present)

Formerly broadcast

Reality 
 Big Brother: Wielki Brat

Drama 
Alarm für Cobra 11 – Die Autobahnpolizei
Ally McBeal
The Blacklist
Californication
Chuck
Close to Home
Cold Case
Columbo
Ed
ER
Flashpoint
The Following
The Forgotten
Fringe
Ghost Whisperer
Gilmore Girls
Gossip Girl
Grey's Anatomy
House
Invasion
JAG
Jake 2.0
Karen Sisco
Kung Fu: The Legend Continues
Kryminalni
Law & Order
Lost
Lucifer
Medical Investigation
Men in Trees
The Mentalist
Mercy
Miami Vice
Monk
The Mysteries of Laura
Nash Bridges
NCIS
NCIS: Los Angeles
The Nine
Nip/Tuck
Northern Exposure
The O.C.
One Tree Hill
Person of Interest
Philly
Presidio Med
Prison Break
Pushing Daisies
Return to Eden
Royal Pains
Rush
Six Feet Under
Smallville
The Sopranos
Spooks
Strong Medicine
Supernatural
Surface
Third Watch
The Vampire Diaries
Vengeance Unlimited
Wicked City
The Wire
Without a Trace

Telenovelas 
Marina
Soy tu dueña
Teresa
Violetta

Sketch show 
The Ben Stiller Show

Sitcom 
30 Rock
ALF
Aliens in America
Ben and Kate
The Big Bang Theory
Complete Savages
The Drew Carey Show
Family Album
Frasier
Friends
Full House
Happy Hour
Hot Properties
Joey
The King of Queens
Kristin
The Nanny
The New Adventures of Old Christine
Nikki
Oliver Beene
Reguły Gry
Some of My Best Friends
Two and a Half Men
The War at Home
What I Like About You

Animation 
Baby Blues
Father of the Pride
The Pink Panther Show
The Powerpuff Girls
Salty's Lighthouse
Tom & Jerry Kids
Yogi's Treasure Hunt

Soap opera 
Julia
Melrose Place
Na Wspólnej
Sunset Beach

Documentary 
Forensic Files
Medicopter 117 – Jedes Leben zählt

Miniseries
Band of Brothers
Into the West

Game shows 
 Milionerzy
Wyścig po kasę

Other 
 Mango 24 (teleshopping)
 Zakochani po uszy (In Love Up To The Ears) (2019–2021)

References

TVN Siedem